Santa's Workshop is the legendary workshop where Santa Claus and his elves are said to live and make the toys and presents given out at Christmas. The exact "location" of Santa's workshop varies depending upon local culture. There are at least eight claimed locations for his workshop. For example, children in Canada send letters to Santa's Workshop at his North Pole location in Canada with the unique postal code of "H0H 0H0". Children in the United States believe the workshop is a sprawling commune located at the North Pole. Some children in the United Kingdom and Finland tend to believe that Father Christmas' Workshop is located in Finland in Korvatunturi, Lapland. In addition to housing the factory where toys are either manufactured or distributed by the elves, the complex also houses the residence of Santa, his wife, companions, and all of the reindeer.

As the workshop is not yet seen in real life, there is no definite geographical location as to where the workshop is located.

Santa Claus grottos and department stores

In the 20th century, it became common during December in large shops or department stores to have a "cavern" in which an actor dressed up as Santa Claus would give gifts to children. Grottos can be large walk-through fantasy cavern-like areas incorporating animatronic characters, such as elves and pantomime characters. This tradition started in Britain in 1879 and then extended in the 1890s to Australian and American department stores seeking to attract customers.

The world's first Christmas grotto was in Lewis's Bon Marche Department Store in Liverpool, England. The grotto was opened in 1879, entitled "Christmas Fairyland". The Grotto has now moved to St. Johns Market, St. Johns Shopping Centre after being saved by Entrepreneur Guy Fennell in 2017. The Grotto now runs by the name 'Liverpool's Famous Grotto'. Shopping malls have also setup interactive exhibits.

In Adelaide, South Australia, the first "Magic Cave" was set up in 1896 at the John Martin's department store on Rundle Street (now Rundle Mall). An annual store-sponsored parade, the Adelaide Christmas Pageant, was initiated in 1933 during which Father Christmas was conducted to the Magic Cave to formally herald the holiday season. Since the closure of John Martin's, the David Jones stores, have continued the tradition of the Magic Cave.

Department stores and shopping centres in the United Kingdom still host Santa's Grottos.

It is traditional that the children receive a toy from Father Christmas, upon visiting his Grotto whether in a shopping mall or a little garden centre. Grottos are sometimes free and they sometimes charge parents to let their children see Santa and receive a surprise gift.

Reproductions
A themed attraction in Santa Claus, Indiana named Santa's Candy Castle emulates the traditional depiction of Santa's workshop. There is also a Santa's Workshop amusement park in North Pole, New York. A 1946 theme park Holiday World & Splashin' Safari was known as "Santa Claus Land" prior to 1984 and is in Santa Claus, Indiana. Another locations for Santa's Workshop, since 1960, can also be found in North Pole Colorado - better known as Cascade Colorado - year round.

Elves

The image of the elves in the workshop was popularized by Godey's Lady's Book, with a front cover illustration for its 1873 Christmas issue showing Santa surrounded by toys and elves with the caption, "Here we have an idea of the preparations that are made to supply the young folks with toys at Christmas time."

Location

In 1879, Thomas Nast revealed to the world in a series of drawings that Santa's workshop is at the North Pole. The Canada Post postal code for the workshop is H0H 0H0. The United States Postal Service recommends mail to Santa's workshop be sent to Santa Claus 1225 Reindeer Rd. North Pole, AK 99705. Much of the mail sent there is instead redirected to a volunteer base in Santa Claus, Indiana.

Each Nordic country also claims Santa's workshop to be located on their territories. Norway claims he lives in Drøbak. In Denmark, he is said to live in Greenland (near Uummannaq). In Sweden, the town of Mora has a theme park named "Santaworld". The national postal terminal in Tomteboda in Stockholm receives children's letters for Santa. In Finland, Korvatunturi has long been known as Santa's home, and two theme parks, Santa Claus Village and Santa Park are located at the Arctic Circle in the municipality of Rovaniemi.

See also

 Santa's Workshop (amusement park)
 Santa's Workshop (film)

References

Santa Claus
Buildings and structures
North Pole
Christmas
Fictional locations
Fictional buildings and structures